Waghadi (Vaghadi) is a village in Shirpur Taluka, Dhule district, Maharashtra, India. It is located just northeast of the city of Shirpur on Route 4. As of 2011 it had a population of 1014, 80% of whom belonged to Scheduled Tribes.

Places of worship
The village has several places of worship:
 Mahadev Temple (Waghadi)
 Baba Pir Mosque
 Sri Krishna Temple (Waghadi)
 Bhavani Mata Temple
 Maruti Temple (Maruti Madir)
 Mahatma jotirao phule Castle
 Chhatrapati Shivaji Maharaj Statue

References

Villages in Dhule district